Furman Lester Fendley (May 16, 1918 – November 30, 2005) was an American politician. He served as a member of the South Carolina House of Representatives.

Life and career 
Fendley was born in Westminster, South Carolina.

In 1965, Fendley was elected to the South Carolina House of Representatives, representing Union County, South Carolina.

Fendley died in November 2005, at the age of 87.

References 

1918 births
2005 deaths
People from Westminster, South Carolina
Members of the South Carolina House of Representatives
20th-century American politicians